The Deccan Express is an express train that leaves daily at 3:15pm, plying between the cities of Pune and Mumbai in India, a distance of 192 km and at 7:00am from Mumbai to Pune.

Services

The train is operated by Indian Railways, coming under the Central Railway zone and it is one of the six-point-to-point express trains which carry thousands of passengers daily between Pune and Mumbai. The other five being the Sinhagad Express, Pragati Express, Deccan Queen, Indrayani Express and Intercity Express.

Deccan Express is named from Deccan Plateau where Pune city is located.

Traction
This train is hauled end to end by a Kalyan-based WCAM-3.

Currently this train hauls end to end by a Ajni WAP-7 locomotive.

Timetable 

While on the return journey, the 11008 Deccan Express leaves Pune at 15:15 and reaches CSTM at 19:17.

History

Throughout history of railways in India the Deccan Queen is one of the most popular trains in India. The Deccan Queen, started on 15 February 

1930 was the fastest and most luxurious train on the Mumbai–Pune section.

Before introduction of the Deccan Queen, Poona Mail was the most luxurious train on this route. Initially the train was owned and operated by Great Indian Peninsula Railway and transferred to Indian Railways after merging of Great Indian Peninsula Railway in Indian Railways. This train used to travel the Mumbai–Pune distance in 2 hours 45 minutes. However, due to increase in suburban traffic the travelling time has increased to 3 hours 15 minutes. This train was served with a pantry car since it was introduced. The train made its first run from Kalyan to Pune and was just a seven bogie train. However the train was later increased till Mumbai CST (formally Victoriya Raani Terminus). The train today hauls 17 bogies along with two guard vans with total of 19 bogies. This train was attached with double deck compartments in 1980s. Initially the train was hauled by EA1 (WCP-1 locomotive) when it was introduced. Later by 1970s the train was hauled by WCM-2 or WCM-4 locomotives. Today it is hauled by WCAM-3/2 locomotive. The Poona Mail and the Deccan Queen used to serve Mumbai–Pune commuters for several years together later when the Poona Mail was extended till Kolhapur and was renamed as the Sahyadri Express.

See also
 Mumbai–Pune Passenger
 Sister trains Mumbai–Pune:

References

Mumbai–Pune trains
Named passenger trains of India
Transport in Mumbai
Rail transport in Maharashtra
Transport in Pune
Express trains in India